Francis Alick Howard  (6 March 1917 – 19 April 1992), better known by his stage-name Frankie Howerd, was an English actor and comedian.

Early life 
Howerd was born the son of soldier Francis Alfred William (1887–1934) and Edith Florence Howard (née Morrison, 1888–1962), at the City Hospital in York, England, in 1917 (not 1922 as he later claimed). His mother worked at the Rowntree's chocolate factory. For his first two and a half years, Howerd lived in a terraced house at 53, Hartoft Street. He described it as "a poorish area of the city near the River Ouse". He later said he had only one memory of living in York and that was of falling down the stairs, an experience which left him with a life-long dread of heights. He returned to York on many occasions for family holidays, however, and later in life spoke of his fondness for the city.

His family moved to Eltham, London when he was a young child, and he was educated at Shooter's Hill Grammar School in Shooter's Hill.

Career 
His first stage appearance was at age 13 but his early hopes of becoming a serious actor were dashed when he failed an audition for the Royal Academy of Dramatic Art. He began to entertain during World War II service in the British Army. It was at this time that he adapted his surname to Howerd "to be different". In 1944 he became a bombardier in Plymouth, was promoted to sergeant, and on 6 June 1944 was part of the D-Day effort but was stuck on a boat off Normandy. Despite suffering from stage fright, he continued to work after the war, beginning his professional career in the summer of 1946 in a touring show called For the Fun of It.

His act was soon heard on radio, when he made his debut, in early December 1946, on the BBC's Variety Bandbox programme with a number of other ex-servicemen. His profile rose in the immediate postwar period (aided with material written by Eric Sykes, Galton and Simpson and Johnny Speight). He then toured the Music Hall circuit with an act including what became his standard catch-phrases such as "titter ye not".  He also became a regular in the 1950s editions of the weekly hard-copy comic Film Fun.

In 1954 he made his screen debut opposite Petula Clark in The Runaway Bus, which had been written for his specific comic talent. Filming took five weeks, with a budget of £45,000.

He then experimented with different formats and contexts, including stage farces, Shakespearean comedy roles, and television sitcoms. At the start of the 1960s, he began to recover his old popularity, initially with a season at Peter Cook's satirical Establishment Club in Soho in London. He was boosted further by success on That Was the Week That Was (TW3) in 1963 and on stage with A Funny Thing Happened on the Way to the Forum (1963–1965), which led into regular television work. In 1966 and 1967, he co-hosted a 90-minute Christmas show called The Frankie and Bruce Christmas Show with Bruce Forsyth, featuring many top acts of the day.

During the 1960s and 1970s, he was involved in shows for the BBC and Thames Television (as well as Frankie Howerd Reveals All for Yorkshire Television in 1980). Ray Galton and Alan Simpson wrote for him from 1964 to 1966 when he worked for the BBC and also for a one-off show for Thames, Frankie Howerd meets the Bee Gees, shown on 20 August 1968. He was known for his seemingly off-the-cuff remarks to the audience, especially in the show Up Pompeii! (1969–70), which was a direct follow-up from Forum. His television work was characterised by direct addresses to camera and by his littering monologues with verbal tics such as "Oooh, no missus" and "Titter ye not". A later sale of his scripts, however, showed that the seemingly off-the-cuff remarks had all been meticulously planned. Barry Cryer said of his technique: "What he could do with a script was amazing, like all the great performers. He transformed something you'd just written – what you hoped was in a Frankie Howerd idiom – but when you heard him do it, my God, it was something else; – it was gossiping over the garden wall, the apparent waffle – he was like a tightrope walker, you thought he's going to fall off in a minute, you thought , 'Come on, Frank' , we're waiting for a laugh, and then, suddenly, Bang. He knew exactly what he was doing." Another feature of his humour was to feign innocence about his obvious and risqué double entendres, while mockingly censuring the audience for finding them funny.

Howerd appeared as Francis Bigger, one of the lead characters in 1967's Carry On Doctor, of which Variety noted, "Added zest is given by the inclusion of Frankie Howerd as a quack 'mind-over-matter' doctor who becomes a reluctant patient. Howerd's brilliantly droll sense of comedy is given plenty of scope."

The success of the film version of Up Pompeii in 1971 saw British exhibitors vote him the ninth most popular star at the British box office that year. He would play versions of the character Lurkio in Up the Chastity Belt (Lurkalot), also in 1971, and Up the Front (Boot Boy Lurk) in 1972.

In 1971 Howerd recorded, with June Whitfield, a comedy version of the song "Je t'aime", previously recorded by Jane Birkin and Serge Gainsbourg, in which she featured as "Mavis" alongside Howerd's "Frank", and a third unexplained sleeping partner named "Arthur". The song was included in the 2004 CD re-issue of Oh! What a Carry On!.

In 1976, Howerd appeared in The Frankie Howerd Show on CBC Television in Canada. It received good ratings but was not renewed.

He was awarded an OBE in 1977.

In 1978, Howerd appeared in the big-budget Hollywood musical Sgt. Pepper's Lonely Hearts Club Band playing Mean Mr Mustard, acting alongside musical and film talent such as Peter Frampton, the Bee Gees, George Burns, Alice Cooper, Aerosmith and Steve Martin. He was cast by producer Robert Stigwood as he was on Stigwood's record label at the time. The film was a critical and commercial flop. Since Howerd was not well known to American audiences, this may have been his biggest exposure in the US.

There was a cabaret tour of New Zealand in 1979. In 1982, Howerd appeared in the televised versions of Gilbert and Sullivan's Trial by Jury (as the Learned Judge) and H.M.S. Pinafore (as Sir Joseph Porter, KCB). He performed a comedy-duet with Cilla Black on Cilla Black's Christmas (1983).

After six years without a regular television show in the United Kingdom (though he had hosted a one-off UK version of The Gong Show for Channel 4, which was critically panned and was not commissioned for a full series), Howerd returned to TV screens in 1987 in the Channel 4 show Superfrank!, scripted by Miles Tredinnick and Vince Powell. In the last years of his career, Howerd developed a following with student audiences and performed a one-man show at universities and in small theatrical venues. He was also a regular guest on the late night BBC Radio 1 programme Into the Night, hosted by Nicky Campbell.

In 1990, he contributed to the last recording studio collaboration between Alan Parsons and Eric Woolfson, on the album Freudiana, performing "Sects Therapy".

Howerd often worked with Sunny Rogers, who was his accompanying pianist from 1960 onwards. She appeared in his TV and live theatre shows including his last major West End appearance — his one-man show — at the Garrick Theatre in 1990.

Personal life

Throughout his career, Howerd hid his potentially career-destroying homosexuality from both his audience and his mother, Edith. (Sexual acts between consenting males were illegal in England and Wales until 1967.) In 1958, he met sommelier Dennis Heymer at the Dorchester Hotel while dining with Sir John Mills; Howerd was 40 and Heymer was 28. Heymer became his lover as well as manager, and stayed with him for more than thirty years, until Howerd's death, with Heymer helping to revive Howerd's flagging career in the 1960s. However, the two had to remain discreet as Howerd feared being blackmailed if anyone beyond his immediate circle found out. The relationship was explored in 2008 in a drama for BBC Four, Rather You Than Me, starring David Walliams and Rafe Spall.

Backstage, Howerd was notoriously bold in his advances, and was known for his promiscuity. One of Howerd's former boyfriends was comic actor Lee Young who created the TV sitcom Whoops Baghdad (1973) for him. Howerd's uncomfortable relationship with his sexuality he once said to Cilla Black, "I wish to God I wasn't gay" as well as his depressive mental state, led him to seek resolution through a series of different methods. Heymer would often drop Howerd off on Friday at his psychiatrist, who would ply him with LSD over the weekend. This experience was later the subject of the March 2015 BBC Radio 4 drama Frankie Takes a Trip.

In his early career, Howerd suffered from a stutter, which caused him some distress, but which he turned to an advantage in developing his delivery style as a comic.

For the last 20 years of Howerd's life, he and Heymer lived in Wavering Down, a house in the village of Cross, Somerset, under the Mendip Hills. After Howerd's death, Heymer curated Howerd's collection of memorabilia until his own death in 2009.

Death
Having contracted a virus during a Christmas trip to the Amazon in 1991, Howerd suffered respiratory problems at the beginning of April 1992 and was taken to a clinic in London's Harley Street, but was discharged at Easter. He collapsed and died of heart failure two weeks later, on the morning of 19 April 1992, aged 75. Two hours before he died, he was speaking on the telephone to his TV producer about new ideas for his next show.

Howerd died the day before fellow comedian Benny Hill. News of the two deaths broke almost simultaneously and some newspapers ran an obituary of Howerd in which Hill was quoted as regretting Howerd's death, saying "We were great, great friends". The quote was released by Hill's unofficial press agent and friend, who was not aware that Hill had died.

Howerd's grave is at St. Gregory's Church in Weare, Somerset. In May 2009, when Heymer died, he was buried near him.

Legacy

A BBC TV biography about Frankie Howerd, Rather You Than Me, was broadcast by BBC Four on 9 April 2008, and repeated on 10 February 2013. The script was written by Peter Harness, after extensive interviews with Howerd's partner, Dennis Heymer. The comedian David Walliams was cast as Howerd.

On 15 May 2009, Heymer died in the home that he and Howerd had shared. He was 79.

Howerd's home, Wavering Down, is a tourist attraction and, in the summer, hosts concerts and opens regularly as a museum of Howerd's collection of memorabilia and personal effects such as his false teeth and ill-fitting toupee, to raise funds for charity.

Howerd also lived at 27 Edwardes Square, Kensington, London W8.  The house bears a blue plaque installed by the Dead Comics' Society in 1993. In March 1999 former colleagues and friends and Howerd's sister Betty attended a fund-raising weekend in York and a blue plaque was placed on the Cumberland Street entrance to the Grand Opera House where it was thought that the general public was more likely to see it, with the inscription: "Frankie Howerd OBE 1917-1992. Son of York". On 26 July 2016, a York Civic Trust plaque was unveiled at 53, Hartoft Street, Howerd's childhood home, by York-born actor Mark Addy and the Lord Mayor of York Councillor Dave Taylor.

The church hall of St Barnabas Church, Eltham, is called the Frankie Howerd Centre.

Howerd's career was described by the comedian Barry Cryer as being "a series of comebacks".

Works

Recordings

Singles
"Three Little Fishies" (1949), Harmony A1001, acc. by Billy Ternent and His Orchestra
"English As She Is Spoken"/"I'm The Man Who's Deputising for the Bull" (1952), Columbia Records, written by Eric Sykes, acc. by Billy Ternent and His Orchestra
"All's Going Well"/"Nymphs and Shepherds" (1953), Philips Records PB214, with Margaret Rutherford
"Up Je t'aime" (1971), with June Whitfield

Albums
 At The Establishment and at the BBC (1963, Decca, scripted by Barry Took and Marty Feldman)
 Please Yourselves (1976, Polydor, scripted by David Nobbs and David McKellar)

Radio
 The Frankie Howerd Show (1966)
 The Frankie Howerd Show (1973–75)
 The Frankie Howerd Variety Show (1978)
 Frankie Howerd's Memoirs (date unknown, but often repeated)

Television

 Frankly Howerd (1959)
 That Was The Week That Was (1962) – Himself
 The Frankie Howerd Show (1964-1966)
 East of Howerd (1966)
 Howerd's Hour (1968)  
 Carry On Christmas (1969) – Robert Browning / Fairy Godmother
 Up Pompeii! (1969–1970) – Lurcio
 Whoops Baghdad (1973) – Ali Oopla
 Further Up Pompeii! (1975) – Lurcio
 The Frankie Howerd Show (1976)
 Up the Convicts (1976) – Jonathan Shirk
 The Howerd Confessions (1976)
 Frankie Howerd Strikes Again (1981)
 Then Churchill Said to Me (1982) 
 The Blunders (1986) – cartoon series voiced by Howerd
 Superfrank!  (1987) – Himself
 All Change (1989) – Uncle Bob
 Frankie Howerd on Campus (1990)
 Further Up Pompeii (1991) – Lurcio
 Frankie's On... (1992)

Video
 Frankie Howerd at His Tittermost (1991) at the Birmingham Hippodrome

Selected filmography
 The Runaway Bus (1954) – Percy Lamb
 The Ladykillers (1955) – The Barrow Boy
 An Alligator Named Daisy (1955) – M.C. at Alligator Rally (uncredited)
 Jumping for Joy (1956) – Willie Joy
 A Touch of the Sun (1956) – William Darling
 Further Up the Creek (1958) – Bosun
 Watch It, Sailor! (1961) – Church organist (guest appearance)
 The Fast Lady (1962) – Road workman in hole
 The Cool Mikado (1963) – Ko-Ko Flintridge
 The Mouse on the Moon (1963) – Himself
 The Great St Trinian's Train Robbery (1966) – Alphonse of Monte Carlo / Alfred Askett
 Carry On Doctor (1967) – Francis Bigger
 Carry On Up the Jungle (1970) – Professor Inigo Tinkle
 Up Pompeii (1971) – Lurcio
 Up the Chastity Belt (1971) – Richard / Lurkalot
 Up the Front (1972) – Lurk
 The House in Nightmare Park (1973) – Foster Twelvetrees
 Sgt Peppers Lonely Hearts Club Band (1978) – Mr. Mustard

Selected bibliography
 Howerd, Frankie (1976). On the Way I Lost It. W. H. Allen & Co., .
 Robert Ross (2001). The Complete Frankie Howerd. Reynolds and Hearn, .

References

External links

 Frankie Howerd at the British Film Institute
 
 
 
 Frankie Howerd: Gay Great From Fyne Times Magazine
 Frankie Howerd Week from British Classic Comedy

1917 births
1992 deaths
20th-century English comedians
20th-century English male actors
British Army personnel of World War II
British male comedy actors
Comedians from Yorkshire
English male comedians
English male film actors
English male stage actors
English male television actors
Gay comedians
English gay actors
British LGBT broadcasters
Male actors from York
Officers of the Order of the British Empire
Royal Artillery soldiers
20th-century English LGBT people
British LGBT comedians